The Église Notre-Dame du Raincy (Church of Notre Dame du Raincy) is a Roman Catholic church in the commune of Le Raincy near Paris. It was built in 1922-23 by the French architects Auguste Perret and Gustave Perret. The edifice is considered a monument of modernism in architecture, using reinforced concrete in a manner that expresses the possibilities of the new material.

Design and construction

At the beginning of the 20th century, Le Raincy was a small parish church for suburbs whose population was rapidly growing.

In 1918, the parish priest of Le Raincy, Felix Nègre, proposed to build a church to commemorate the French victory in the Battle of the Marne in 1914. Through connections among parishioners, Nègre came into contact with the Perrets. The design used concrete for economy. Rather than attempting to simulate masonry, the new material was used on its own terms, with standardized elements, slender supports, and thin membranes pierced by windows.

The completed church received widespread favorable attention, influencing architectural thought at a time of rebuilding and economic recovery.

Glass
The magnificent stained glass was created by Marguerite Huré using colored coatings on clear glass for economy. The colors are dominated by blues near the entry and progress to warmer tones in the sanctuary.

Organ
The 1875 John Abbey organ belonging to the original parish church was moved to the new church. Changes made in 1957 changed its character. Public donations are now being sought for a new organ. The new organ was inaugurated by Pierre Pincemaille on october, the 17th of 2010.

Restoration
At the time of the church's construction, concrete was still an experimental material. Deterioration was noted by the 1960s, and studies showed that the original concrete contained an excess of lime and water. Coverage of the steel reinforcing was also deficient. Restoration work has proceeded, with particular attention to the tower, using more modern materials and techniques.

Copies

In 1937, at the Tokyo Woman's Christian University, a chapel was built that was similar to Notre-Dame du Raincy. It is around half the size. The copy by architect Antonín Raymond was unauthorised. Christine Viskenne-Auzanneau argues that: "Reimann knew about Notre Dame du Raincy".

The Czech architect, Bedřich Feuerstein came to Tokyo in 1926 and worked with Reimann between 1926 and 1931, after working a year in France with the Perret brothers.

The Raincy church also led to other inspirations in Japan.

The Church of St. John the Baptist in Brussels-Molenbeek (Belgium), is obviously also inspired by L'église Notre-Dame du Raincy.

Further reading 

 Peter Collins, Concrete : The Vision of a New Architecture, New York, Horizon Press, 1959.
 Kenneth Frampton, Modern Architecture 1851-1945, New York, Rizzoli International Publications, 1983.
 Roberto Gargiani, Auguste Perret, Gallimard / Electa, 1994, pp. 118–123.
 Erwin Heinle, Türme aller Zeiten - aller Kulturen (3eme édition), Deutsche Verlags-Anstalt, Stuttgart (Allemagne), 1997, pp. 220.
 Bertrand Lemoine, 100 Monuments du XXeme Siècle, Éditions France Loisirs, Paris (France), 2000, pp. 84–85.
 Bernard Toulier, Architecture et patrimoine du XXeme Siècle en France, Éditions du patrimoine, Paris (France), 1999, pp. 206–207.

References

External links
  Notre-Dame du Raincy at Structurae website  ; page in English : notredameduraincy.fr/en - Pay donation here (bank card or PayPal.
 longitudinal section of the church 
 Notes on construction, designers, organ, at the parish website 
 
 Website of Notre-Dame du Raincy

Churches in Seine-Saint-Denis
Roman Catholic churches completed in 1923
20th-century Roman Catholic church buildings in France